Camilla Strøm Henriksen (born 9 January 1968) is a Norwegian director, screenwriter and actress. She is the daughter of the puppeteer and actress Elisabeth Strøm Henriksen.

Career
Strøm Henriksen started out as an actress, working in theatre, TV and films. She has previously both won and been nominated for the Amanda Award, the main Norwegian film award. For her debut in A Handful of Time she also won the Best Actress Rouen Nordic Film Festival.

She decided to move into writing and directing and studied at the London Film School, she graduated in 2004 with an MA in directing.

Filmography

Director

TV series

’’Hotel Cæsar’’ (2005-2014) - TV series
’’Hvaler’’ (2010)

Writer-Director
 ’’Føniks’’ (2018)

Shorts

’’Night Call’’ (2004)
’’Lace’’ (2003)

References

1968 births
Living people
Actresses from Oslo
Norwegian women film directors
Norwegian film directors
Norwegian screenwriters
21st-century Norwegian actresses
Norwegian film actresses
Norwegian television actresses
Norwegian stage actresses
Alumni of the London Film School
Norwegian women screenwriters